William Norman Hillier-Fry, CMG (12 August 1923 – 11 January 2015) was a British diplomat. He died in January 2015 at the age of 91.

Educated at Colfe's Grammar School and St Edmund Hall, Oxford, Hillier-Fry was commissioned into the Loyal Regiment in 1942. After the War, he joined HM Foreign Service in 1946. He served as British Ambassador to Afghanistan between 1979 and 1980. Subsequently, he was the British High Commissioner to Uganda between 1980 and 1983. He was appointed CMG in 1982

References

1923 births
2015 deaths
Ambassadors of the United Kingdom to Afghanistan
People educated at Colfe's School
Alumni of St Edmund Hall, Oxford
Companions of the Order of St Michael and St George